The 2022–23 Ardal SE season (also known as the 2022–23 Floodlighting and Electrical Services Ardal SE season for sponsorship reasons) is the second season of the new third-tier southern region football in Welsh football pyramid, part of the Ardal Leagues.

Teams
The league was made up of 16 teams competing for one automatic promotion place to Cymru South, whilst the second-placed team qualified for a play-off with the second-placed team of Ardal SW. Three teams are relegated to Tier 4.

Team changes

To Ardal SE
Promoted from Gwent County League Premier Division
 Lliswerry
 Blaenavon Blues
 RTB Ebbw Vale

Promoted from Mid Wales Football League East Division
 Brecon Corinthians

Relegated from Cymru South
 Risca United
 Undy Athletic

From Ardal SE
Promoted to Cymru South
 Abergavenny Town

Relegated
 Panteg
 Abertillery Excelsiors
 Aberbargoed Buds

Transferred to Ardal NE
 Llandrindod Wells
 Rhayader Town

Stadia and locations

Source: Ardal SE Ground Information

 (Risca United and Trethomas Bluebirds groundshare, as do Lliswerry and Newport City)

League table

Results

References

External links
Football Association of Wales
Ardal Southern Leagues
Ardal Southern Twitter Page
Tier 3 Rules & Regulations

3
Ardal Leagues
Wales